Yongxin (Mandarin: 永新镇) is a township in Santai County, Mianyang, Sichuan, China. In 2010, Yongxin had a total population of 8,082: 4,207 males and 3,875 females: 1,078 aged under 14, 6,001 aged between 15 and 65 and 1,003 aged over 65.

References 

Towns in Sichuan
Santai County